Maurice Vertongen (7 May 1886 – 27 March 1968) was a Belgian footballer. He played in six matches for the Belgium national football team from 1907 to 1911.

References

External links
 

1886 births
1968 deaths
Belgian footballers
Belgium international footballers
Place of birth missing
Association footballers not categorized by position